TCDD DE21500 were diesel-electric locomotives built for operations on Turkish State Railways. Forty General Electric U20C units with GE engines were built in 1964–65. Most of the locomotives are retired from service. The locomotive was a part of the State Railways' dieselisation of its network and was the first mainline diesel locomotive. Most of them were retired in the early 2000s, with a few seeing service into the later half of the decade.

External links
 Trains of Turkey page on DE21500

General Electric locomotives
Co-Co locomotives
Turkish State Railways diesel locomotives
Standard gauge locomotives of Turkey
Railway locomotives introduced in 1957